A polyphyodont is any animal whose teeth are continually replaced.  In contrast, diphyodonts are characterized by having only two successive sets of teeth.

Polyphyodonts include most toothed fishes, many reptiles such as crocodiles and geckos, and most other vertebrates, mammals being the main exception.

Growth
New, permanent teeth grow in the jaws, usually under or just behind the old tooth, from stem cells in the dental lamina. Young animals typically have a full set of teeth when they hatch; there is no tooth change in the egg.  Within days, tooth replacement begins, usually in the back of the jaw continuing forward like a wave. On average a tooth is replaced every few months.

Crocodilia
Crocodilia are the only non-mammalian vertebrates with tooth sockets.  Alligators grow a successional tooth (a small replacement tooth) under each mature functional tooth for replacement once a year, each tooth being replaced up to 50 times in the alligator's life. Crocodilia are researched for tooth regeneration in humans.

Evolution in mammals

Manatees, elephants and kangaroos are unusual among mammals because they are polyphyodonts, in contrast to most other mammals which replace their teeth only once in their lives (diphyodont).  Although most other extant mammals are not polyphyodont, mammalian ancestors were.  During the evolution of Therapsida, there was a period during which mammals were so small and short-lived that wear on the teeth yielded no significant selection pressure to constantly replace them. Instead, mammals evolved different types of teeth which formed a unit able to crack the exoskeleton of arthropods. Molars came later in their evolution (as earlier in cerapods and Diplodocus). Mammals chew (masticate) their food which requires a set of firmly attached, strong teeth and a "full" tooth row without gaps.

The manatees have no incisor or canine teeth, just a set of cheek teeth, which are not clearly differentiated into molars and premolars. These teeth are continuously replaced throughout their life with new teeth growing at the rear as older teeth fall out from farther forward in the mouth, a process known as "hind molar progression" or “marching molars”.

See also

Regeneration (biology)
Regenerative medicine
Regenerative endodontics
Schultz's rule
Sinoconodon
Squamata
Tooth development

References

Further reading
 
 

Fish anatomy
Dentition types
Animal anatomy